William Kenrick  (8 June 1831 – 31 July 1919) was an English iron founder and hardware manufacturer. He was a Liberal Unionist Party politician who was active in local government in Birmingham and sat in the House of Commons from 1885 to 1899.

Life
Kenrick was born at West Bromwich, Staffordshire, the son of Archibald Kenrick, JP (1798–1878), an iron founder, and his wife, Anne Paget (1798–1864). He became a director of the family firm, Archibald Kenrick & Sons.

He also became active in local politics, becoming a town councillor in 1870, alderman in 1872 and mayor of Birmingham from 1877 to 1878. In the 1885 general election he became MP for Birmingham North.  He held the seat until he resigned in 1899 when he became a Privy Councillor. In 1911 he was given Honorary Freedom of the City of Birmingham.

Kenrick had educational and artistic interests. He was a Governor of King Edward's School, Birmingham and was closely connected with the Arts and Crafts movement. He was Chairman of the Museum and School of Arts Committee and was visited by William Morris in 1880. In 1895 he became a director of the Birmingham Guild of Handicraft when it became a limited company.

Kenrick died at his home, The Grove, Park Lane, Harborne, Edgbaston, Warwickshire. The panelling of a room of his house is in the Victoria and Albert Museum in London.

Marriage and family connections
On 26 August 1862, Kenrick married Mary Chamberlain (1838–1918), Joseph's sister, at the Union Chapel, Islington. His sister Harriet had married Joseph Chamberlain in July 1861; they were the parents of statesman Austen Chamberlain. After Harriet's death in 1863, Chamberlain married Harriet and William's cousin, Florence Kenrick, in 1868. Joseph and Florence were the parents of Prime Minister Neville Chamberlain.

Children
Cicely Kenrick (1869–1950), married Ernest Debenham on 8 November 1892.
Millicent Mary Kenrick (1871–1932), married Claude Gerald Napier-Clavering on 30 July 1897; mother of the actor Alan Napier
Wilfred Byng Kenrick (1872–1962), married his cousin, Norah Beale, on 24 July 1906; later Lord Mayor of Birmingham
Gerald William Kenrick (1876–1953), married his cousin, Ruth Chamberlain, on 26 April 1912

References

External links 
 

1831 births
1919 deaths
Liberal Unionist Party MPs for English constituencies
UK MPs 1885–1886
UK MPs 1886–1892
UK MPs 1892–1895
UK MPs 1895–1900
Mayors of Birmingham, West Midlands
Members of the Privy Council of the United Kingdom
Liberal Party (UK) MPs for English constituencies